Juho "Jussi" Kurikkala (12 August 1912 – 10 March 1951) was a Finnish cross-country skier who competed in the 1930s. He was born in Kalajoki, and won three medals at the FIS Nordic World Ski Championships with a silver in the 4 × 10 km relay in 1937, a gold in the same event in 1938, and a gold in the 18 km in 1939. He was also a long-distance runner and competed in the marathon at the 1948 Summer Olympics.

Cross-country skiing results
All results are sourced from the International Ski Federation (FIS).

World Championships
 3 medals – (2 gold, 1 silver)

References

External links

Birthname, from the Swedish Ski Federation 

1912 births
1951 deaths
People from Kalajoki
People from Oulu Province (Grand Duchy of Finland)
Finnish male cross-country skiers
Athletes (track and field) at the 1948 Summer Olympics
Finnish male long-distance runners
Finnish male marathon runners
Olympic athletes of Finland
FIS Nordic World Ski Championships medalists in cross-country skiing
Sportspeople from North Ostrobothnia
20th-century Finnish people